Bhoomiyile Rajakkanmar is a 1987 Indian Malayalam-language political thriller film directed by Thampi Kannanthanam, written by Dennis Joseph, and produced by Joy Thomas under the company Jubilee Productions. It features Mohanlal, Suresh Gopi, Nalini, Balan K. Nair, Adoor Bhasi, Jagadish, and Jagathy Sreekumar in major roles. The music for the film was composed by S. P. Venkatesh. This film was a super hit and it was remade in Telugu.

Plot

The scion of the Thekkumkoor royal family, Valiya Thamburan (meaning big leader), wants to introduce his heir Mahendra Varma (Mohanlal) to democracy. But Mahendra Varma is not interested in politics and is not very astute in the political game early in his political journey. For this sole purpose, Valiya Thamburam (Adoor Bhasi) bribes the Chief Minister to make Mahendra Varma a minister in the current state government.

Once in power, Mahendra Varma tries to be independent from the Chief Minister's government and helps his friend Jayan (Suresh Gopi), who is against the policies of the Chief Minister. Mahendra Varma after seeing the atrocities committed by the current political system joins forces with Jayan to improve the political scene of the state.

Cast

Soundtrack
The music was composed by S. P. Venkatesh and the lyrics were written by Shibu Chakravarthy.

Release
The initial release date was delayed due to an issue with the Central Board of Film Certification regarding a dialogue in the film which remarks that a king's rule is better than democracy. Kannanthanam managed to convince the board members of the merits of the film and was finally certified. It was a commercial success.

References

External links 
 

1987 films
1980s Malayalam-language films
1980s thriller drama films
Films directed by Thampi Kannanthanam
1987 drama films